Georg Richard Lewin (25 April 1820 – 1 November 1896) was a German dermatologist.

Biography
He was born in Sondershausen and died in Berlin. He was educated at the universities of Halle and Berlin, graduating as doctor of medicine in 1845. After a postgraduate course at the universities of Vienna, Würzburg, and Paris he settled in Berlin, where he practised as a specialist first in otology, and later in dermatology and syphilis. In 1862 Lewin was admitted to the medical faculty of his alma mater as privat-docent in otology. In 1865 he became chief physician in the department of dermatology and syphilis at the Charité Hospital, and in 1868 was appointed assistant professor.

In 1880 Lewin became a member of the imperial department of health, and in 1884 received the title of "Geheimer Medicinalrat." In the same year, through the influence of Otto von Bismarck, Lewin's clinic was divided into two departments, Lewin retaining the class in syphilis, while Ernst Schweninger, Bismarck's physician, was appointed chief physician for dermatology. This action of the government aroused much indignation in the medical faculties of most of the universities of Germany, and much public sympathy was expressed for Lewin.

Lewin was very successful in his profession. He introduced several new methods in the treatment of syphilis and in dermatology, among which may be mentioned the subcutaneous injection of mercuric chloride and the spray application in diseases of the throat. His mercury sublimate injections for the treatment of syphilis were to be administered daily. Carriage horses delivered the costly therapy, and were referred to as "Sublimatsschimmel" [sublimate greys].

Publications
He was an industrious writer, and contributed many essays to the medical journals:
"Klinik der Krankheiten des Kehlkopfes," 2d ed., Berlin, 1863;
"Inhalationstherapie und Krankheiten der Respirationsorgane," 2d ed., ib. 1865;
"Behandlung der Syphilis Durch Subcutane Sublimatinjectionen," ib. 1869.

References

Pagel, Biog. Lex.; 
Meyers Konversations-Lexikon

External links
 

1820 births
1896 deaths
People from Sondershausen
19th-century German Jews
German dermatologists